Dirk Denkers (born January 27, 1957) is a retired American soccer player who spent one season in both the North American Soccer League and  Major Indoor Soccer League as well as an unknown number in the American Soccer League.

Denkers attended UC Davis where he played on the men's soccer team from 1975 to 1977.  In 1978, Denkers turned professional with the Minnesota Kicks of the North American Soccer League.  He also played the 1980-1981 Major Indoor Soccer League season with the San Francisco Fog.  He also played for the Sacramento Gold of the American Soccer League.

References

External links
 NASL/MISL Stats

1957 births
Living people
American soccer players
American Soccer League (1933–1983) players
Major Indoor Soccer League (1978–1992) players
Minnesota Kicks players
North American Soccer League (1968–1984) players
Sacramento Gold (1976–1980) players
San Francisco Fog (MISL) players
Soccer players from California
Sportspeople from Palo Alto, California
University of California, Davis alumni
Association football defenders 
Association football midfielders